Bruce W. Jentleson (born June 26, 1951) is a professor of public policy and political science at Duke University, where he served from 2000 to 2005 as Director of the Terry Sanford Institute of Public Policy.

Early life and education
Jentleson was born in 1951. He obtained a bachelor's degree in 1973 from Cornell. He obtained a master's degree in 1982 from the London School of Economics. He obtained a PhD in 1983 from Cornell University.

Career
Jentleson is a professor at Duke University. He was a professor at UC-Davis.

He was a foreign policy aide to Senator Dave Durenberger (1978–79), and was a foreign policy aide to Senator Al Gore (1987–88). He was a senior foreign policy advisor in the Clinton administration State Department (1993–94), and was a senior foreign policy advisor to Vice President Al Gore in his 2000 presidential campaign. He was senior advisor to the US State Department Policy Planning Director from 2009 to 2011.

Jentleson served on the Obama 2012 campaign National Security Advisory Steering Committee. He served on a policy commission, the Responsibility to Protect (R2P) Working Group co-chaired by Madeleine Albright (2011–13).

He is a co-founder of the Bridging the Gap project, promoting greater policy relevance among academics.

Personal life 
Jentleson is the father of writer Adam Jentleson.

Books
 Bruce W Jentleson. With Friends Like These. Reagan, Bush, and Saddam. 1982–1990. (1994)
 Steven Weber; Bruce W Jentleson. The End of Arrogance: America in the Global Competition of Ideas.
 Bruce W Jentleson. American Foreign Policy: The Dynamics of Choice in the 21st Century (2014)

References

External links
Bruce Jentleson articles and profile on The Huffington Post
Bruce Jentleson profile on The Globalist

American political scientists
Cornell University alumni
Duke University faculty
Alumni of the London School of Economics
Living people
1951 births